The FIBA EuroCup is the former name of an international professional basketball club competition for clubs throughout Europe that was renamed the FIBA EuroChallenge in July 2008. The 2007–08 season, the last for the competition under the EuroCup banner, featured 38 competing teams, from 23 different countries. The draw for the groups was held on August 5, 2007, at the Kempinski Hotel in Munich. 

The 2007–08 FIBA EuroCup, organized by FIBA Europe, was the fifth season of the competition regarded as the third-strongest pan-European club basketball competition, behind the Euroleague and ULEB Cup, the latter of which was renamed the Eurocup for 2008–09.

Format
In all, 38 teams were involved. Teams from the lowest ranked countries or teams who took lower place in their national championship play in elimination round 1. The winners of elimination round 1 meet teams who took higher place in their national championship in Elimination Round 2. The winners from Elimination Round 2, advance to the group stage (qualifying round). After group stage, teams play Quarter Final Round and then Final Four.

Elimination rounds
In all in elimination round 1, 12 teams. Each team plays two games (home and away).
The winners from elimination round 1 advance to elimination round 2. There also two games (home and away). The winners of elimination round 2 advance to the group stage (the qualifying round).

Qualifying round
In all in the group 16 teams. It: Group A, Group B, Group C, Group D. The matches plays round-robin competition (home and away). Top two places advance to the quarter-final.

Quarter-final
Top two places of the groups advance to quarter-finals. The quarter-final games will be played two game (if need three games). The winners of the quarter-final round advance to the Final Four.

Final Four
The Final Four matches include the semi-finals and final, and the match for third place. It was held on April 18 and April 20, in Cyprus, Spyros Kyprianou Arena.

Teams
The labels in the parentheses show how each team qualified for the place of its starting round (TH: title holders;):
1st, 2nd, 3rd, 4th, 5th, etc.: League position after eventual Playoffs
CW: Cup winners

Preliminary rounds

First elimination round

|}

Second elimination round

|}

Qualifying round
A total number of sixteen teams participated in the qualifying round. They were divided over four groups of in each four teams. The top two teams in each group advance to quarter-final playoffs. The matches were played in a round-robin competition.

Group A

Group B

Group C

Group D

Quarter-finals

Final Four
The Final Four was held from 18 until 20 April 2008 in Limassol, Spyros Kyprianou Arena.

External links
Official site
Eurobasket.com

 
Euro
2007